Melanephia is a genus of moths of the family Erebidae.

Species
Some species of this genus are:
Melanephia brunneiventris Berio, 1956
Melanephia cinereovariegata Le Cerf, 1922
Melanephia endophaea Hampson, 1926
Melanephia metarhabdota Hampson, 1926
Melanephia nigrescens (Wallengren, 1856)
Melanephia trista (Snellen, 1872)
Melanephia vola Viette, 1971

References

Calpinae
Moth genera